Sydney Albert Fursland (31 July 1914 – 1990) was a Welsh footballer who played in the English Football League for Cardiff City and Stoke City.

Career
Fursland was born in Llwynypia and began his career with Cardiff City and made two appearances for the "Bluebirds" during the 1933–34 season. He left for Welsh League side Bangor City in November 1934 and returned to league football with Stoke City in August 1935. He was only give a reserve player role by manager Bob McGrory playing four matches in three seasons scoring once against Huddersfield Town in November 1936.

Career statistics

References

1914 births
1990 deaths
People from Llwynypia
Sportspeople from Rhondda Cynon Taf
Welsh footballers
Association football forwards
Cardiff City F.C. players
Bangor City F.C. players
Stoke City F.C. players
English Football League players